Interstate 69 (I-69) is a proposed Interstate Highway that will pass through the southeastern part of the US state of Arkansas. The only section of Future I-69 that is currently open to traffic is the  eastern leg of the Monticello Bypass. This section of the Monticello Bypass is currently two lanes and signed as U.S. Highway 278 Bypass (US 278 Byp.). As of March 2023, a second section between the eastern end of the Monticello Bypass and Arkansas Highway 293 is under construction, and will be temporarily designated as Arkansas Highway 569 (AR-569) upon opening, until the remainder of I-69 through Arkansas is completed.

Planned extension
I-69 has been divided into a number of sections of independent utility (SIUs).

SIU 12 (Arkansas portion)
I-69 will enter Arkansas on the planned Charles W. Dean Bridge south of Arkansas City, then continue west to U.S. Highway 65 (US 65) near McGehee; US 278 will also be rerouted there from its present crossing with US 82 at the Greenville Bridge. This is the western portion of SIU 12; the remaining portion consists of the east end of the Dean Bridge, near Greenville, Mississippi. Environmental studies for this segment, including the Dean Bridge, have been completed and the Federal Highway Administration (FHWA) issued a record of decision (ROD) approving the route through SIU 12 in 2004.

On October 15, 2006, the FHWA directed the Arkansas Highway and Transportation Department (AHTD) to begin land acquisition for I-69 from US 65 to the west bank of the Mississippi River where the Dean Bridge will be built. The first phase of this section was funded for FY2010 in AHTD's 2010–2013 Statewide Transportation Improvement Plan (STIP). In January 2017, AHTD reported that the Arkansas portion of SIU 12, including the Charles W. Dean Bridge, is "shovel ready", pending receipt of funding and completion of any actions required on the part of Mississippi to begin construction on the bridge.

SIU 13
US 278 will leave I-69 near McGehee and rejoin its existing routing. I-69 will continue on a separate alignment to Monticello, where it will meet the I-530 extension, then bypass Wilmar and Warren to the south and turn to the southwest, crossing the Ouachita River and running north of El Dorado near Louann to meet US 82 west of El Dorado between Magnolia and El Dorado.

The final environmental impact statement (EIS) on SIU 13 was completed in April 2006, and the FHWA issued a ROD approving the EIS on May 25, 2006. This  segment is currently in the final design phase, with construction expected to cost $784 million. Arkansas further divides SIU 13 into several smaller segments. Construction on the first leg of SIU 13, the  eastern leg of the Monticello Bypass between US 425 and US 278 east of Monticello, began in November 2011. The first two lanes of the Monticello Bypass (initially signed as US 278 Byp.) opened to traffic on October 11, 2018, and represents the first I-69 mainline project to be completed in Arkansas. Arkansas submitted a $25-million FASTLane grant application to the FHWA in May 2016 to continue design and right-of-way acquisition for the  section of I-69 between Monticello and McGehee. In November 2016, AHTD submitted a revision to its FASTLane grant application requesting additional funds to include construction of the McGehee to Monticello section. According to the 2021–2024 STIP, $69 million (equivalent to $ in ) is planned in FY2022 to begin construction on two lanes of the Monticello–McGhee section. Construction began in December 2022.An additional $4.9 million (equivalent to $ in ) was allocated in FY2019 to continue design and right-of-way acquisition for the western section of the Monticello Bypass.

SIU 14
From US 82, I-69 will continue to the southwest, crossing the Louisiana state line near Haynesville, Louisiana. Arkansas and Louisiana officials continue to work on the draft EIS for this portion of the route, with some changes being made with public inputs.

SIU 28
Segment 28 will extend I-530 from its current terminus in Pine Bluff to a planned interchange with I-69 south of Monticello. This segment has been divided into several smaller sections, with work proceeding at various rates on each. In June 2006, a  section of the I-530 extension opened to traffic between Highway 35 (AR 35) and US 278 near Wilmar signed as AR 530. The remaining portions of SIU 28 are in various stages of land acquisition and construction. Objections from the community of Pinebergen has forced planners to reconsider the routing of the northernmost segment of the I-530 extension, delaying its construction. Public meetings were conducted in late 2006 and early 2007, and the alignment of the north end of the I-530 extension was shifted slightly. Construction on the interchange where the I-530 extension will tie into the existing I-530 near Ohio Street on the south side of Pine Bluff began on October 29, 2007. On March 8, 2008, the AHTD awarded an $11.8-million (equivalent to $ in ) contract to T.J. Lambrecht Construction, Inc. of Joliet, Illinois, to construct  of the I-530 extension through Jefferson, Lincoln, and Cleveland counties. A segment from I-530 to AR 114 in opened in 2013 with a segment from AR 114 to AR 11 opening in 2015. There is still a gap between AR 11 and AR 35.

Exit list

References

 Arkansas
69
69